Carl Owens (1929 – December 11, 2002) was an American artist born in Detroit, Michigan. His professional experience in the Art began as an illustrator in the U.S. Army. Later, he taught art in the Detroit Public Schools and served as staff artist for the school system. He was a member of the National Conference of Artists and worked as a self-employed artist from 1968 until his death.

In addition to numerous private collections, his fine art has been on exhibition at: The Whitney Museum of American Art, New York; The Minneapolis Institute of Arts; The Art Institute of Chicago; the M. H. de Young Memorial Museum, San Francisco; the Detroit Institute of Arts; the Cincinnati Art Museum; the Smithsonian Institution, Washington, DC; the North American Black Historical Museum, Ontario, Canada; the Charles H. Wright Museum of African American History, Detroit, Michigan; and the Detroit Historical Museum.

Awards

the New York Society of Illustrators Citation for Merit
Outstanding Artist Award, Michigan Chapter
National Conference of Artists
the Mayor's Award of Merit
the American Black Artists Pioneer Award
the Optimists International Certificate of Appreciation for Community Service
the American Black Artists Award for Outstanding Achievement in Visual Arts
The National Conference of Artists First Afrikan World Festival Award
Testimonial Resolution and Spirit of Detroit Award from the Detroit City Council

Paintings

Great Kings of Africa
Soul of a Nation
Roots, Stems and Flowers
Ford Salutes the Black Composer
Ingenious Americans
The Life of Frederick Douglass
A Picture History of the Afro-American
Sisters of The Sun
Strong Women
Strong Men

References

Carl Owens - First Art Source (2006). Retrieved on April 23, 2007 from https://web.archive.org/web/20070403123815/http://www.firstartsource.com/Bios/CarlOwens.htm
Carl Owens African American Artist (2005). Retrieved on April 22, 2007 from http://www.brianowensart.com/article2.html
Tech Times Carl Owens (2006). Retrieved on April 23, 2007 from https://web.archive.org/web/20070930185841/http://www.tntech.edu/techtimes/2005/05_08/08_12/owens.html

20th-century American artists
1929 births
2002 deaths
Artists from Detroit